George Russell Renwick (7 August 1901 – 25 July 1984) was a British athlete who competed mainly in the 400 metres.

He competed for Great Britain in the 1924 Summer Olympics held in Paris, France in the 4 x 400 metre relay where he won the bronze medal with his team mates Edward Toms, Richard Ripley and Guy Butler.

Renwick was headmaster of Dover College from 1934 to 1954 during a difficult period. He evacuated the College to Poltimore House in Devon in World War II.  On its return to Dover in 1945, he continued the expansion of the College and promoted it as a centre of sporting excellence.

References 

1901 births
1984 deaths
British male sprinters
Headmasters of Dover College
Olympic bronze medallists for Great Britain
Athletes (track and field) at the 1924 Summer Olympics
Olympic athletes of Great Britain
Medalists at the 1924 Summer Olympics
Olympic bronze medalists in athletics (track and field)